Valerian Zaharia Gârlă (born 6 July 1986 in Berbești, Vâlcea, Romania) is a Romanian footballer who plays as a midfielder for SpVgg Ingelheim.

References

External links
 
 
 

1986 births
Living people
People from Vâlcea County
Romanian footballers
Association football midfielders
Liga I players
FC U Craiova 1948 players
SCM Râmnicu Vâlcea players
CSM Deva players
FC Milsami Orhei players
BFV Hassia Bingen players
Romanian expatriate footballers
Romanian expatriate sportspeople in Germany
Expatriate footballers in Germany